Fame is an unincorporated community on the South Fork South Branch Potomac River in Pendleton County, West Virginia, United States.

References

Unincorporated communities in Pendleton County, West Virginia
Unincorporated communities in West Virginia